Bentong is a federal constituency in Bentong District, Pahang, Malaysia, that has been represented in the Dewan Rakyat since 1959.

The federal constituency was created in the 1958 redistribution and is mandated to return a single member to the Dewan Rakyat under the first past the post voting system.

Demographics 
彭亨国席 Pahang - 马来西亚第15届全国大选 | 中國報

History

Polling districts 
According to the federal gazette issued on 31 October 2022, the Bentong constituency is divided into 40 polling districts.

Representation history

State constituency

Current state assembly members

Local governments

Election results
 
-9.05
-6.40
+24.35
+1.20
+0.25

References

Pahang federal constituencies